Orra White Hitchcock (March 8, 1796 – May 26, 1863) was one of America's earliest women botanical and scientific illustrators and artists, best known for illustrating the scientific works of her husband, geologist Edward Hitchcock (1793–1864), but also notable for her own artistic and scientific work.

Life 

Orra White was born to a prosperous farming family (Jarib and Ruth Sherman White) in South Amherst, Massachusetts.  She was educated by a tutor and at two “ladies” schools, proved herself a child prodigy in numerous scientific and classical subjects, and showed early promise in drawing and painting.  From 1813 to 1818 she taught young girls natural sciences, and the fine and decorative arts at Deerfield Academy.  Her early training grounded her in both science and art, and she has been called the Connecticut River Valley's "earliest and most often published woman artist."

On May 31, 1821 Orra White married geologist Edward Hitchcock, principal of Deerfield Academy, minister, professor and third president of Amherst College. Hitchcock's art was integral to the work of her husband. She made hundreds of illustrations for Edward Hitchcock's scientific publications, including detailed landscapes of the Connecticut River Valley for his Massachusetts geological survey volumes, and custom designed charts that illustrated his local discoveries and his classroom lectures.  In addition, she made detailed drawings of native flowers and grasses and small precise watercolors of small local mushrooms.  Her work is a time-focused chronicle of the scenic, botanically and geologically diverse Connecticut River Valley in western Massachusetts. Orra White Hitchcock, a scientist in her own right, had the contemporary reputation as one of the valley's “most distinguished naturalists.”

Painted herbaria 

Between 1817 and 1821 Hitchcock and her husband collected native plants for a conventional herbarium. At the same time, she created a 64-page album of watercolors of about 175 local flower and grass specimens for her Herbarium parvum, pictum.  This painted herbarium is in the Deerfield Academy Archives.

In the summer and fall, she created a small watercolor album of native mushrooms and lichens, Fungi selecti picti.  Edward Hitchcock labeled and catalogued the specimens.  This painted album is in the Smith College Archives; a facsimile has been published by the Mortimer Rare Book Collection, Smith College.

Landscapes and geological illustrations 

Hitchcock made drawings for more than 200 plates and 1,000 wood-engraved or woodcut illustrations for Edward's professional publications.  The subjects included landscapes, geologic strata, specimens, and more. The most well known appear in her husband's seminal works, the 1833 Report on the Geology, Mineralogy, Botany, and Zoology of Massachusetts and its successor, the 1841 Final Report produced when he was State Geologist.  For the 1833 edition, Pendleton's Lithography (Boston) lithographed nine of Hitchcock's Connecticut River Valley drawings and printed them as plates for the work.  In 1841, B. W. Thayer and Co., Lithographers (Boston) printed revised lithographs and an additional plate.  The hand-colored plate "Autumnal Scenery. View in Amherst"  Hitchcock's most frequently seen work.

Classroom drawings 

Between 1828 and the 1840s, Hitchcock made hundreds of large and dramatic classroom charts of geologic cross-sections, prehistoric beasts (like the Megatherium), fossils and ichnological (later called dinosaur) footprints.  She copied scientific illustrations from contemporary works and made original illustrations of her husband's new ideas or discoveries, like Ornithichnites,  He considered them "indispensable aids" for his lectures.  The Amherst College Archives and Special Collections holds an extensive collection of classroom charts.

Other works 

Hitchcock's first documented published drawing is from an 1818 article by her husband in the periodical Port Folio.  On rare occasions, she created illustrations for other scientists. Hitchcock's last documented work was her symbolic illustrations for her husband's Religious Lectures on Peculiar Phenomena in the Four Seasons, including an emblematic representation of spring and a stylized rainbow.

Hitchcock raised 6 surviving children, taught them art and science and was Edward Hitchcock's partner in his scientific undertakings. She traveled with her husband in the United States and to England and Europe (in 1850).  She is the mother of geologist Charles Henry Hitchcock (1836–1919) and physical education and hygiene pioneer Edward Hitchcock, Jr. (1828–1911).

Edward acknowledged his wife's essential contributions to his work in the dedication of The Religion of Geology, citing her drawings as more powerful than his pen.

Orra White Hitchcock died at 67 on May 26, 1863 from consumption.

Though she was not a trained professional, Hitchcock's scientific intellect and the artistic ability to visually transcribe key scientific principles and natural phenomena, flora and fauna, enabled her to make substantial contributions to the understanding of geology and botany in the first half of the nineteenth century in the United States.
   
While published illustrations exist, only a small number of Hitchcock's original works survives.  The Amherst College Archives and Special Collections has the most extensive documentation of her life and work, in the Edward and Orra White Hitchcock Papers and copies of all of Edward Hitchcock's scientific publications.

Exhibitions 
The Mead Art Museum at Amherst College held the first major retrospective exhibition of her work in 2011, "Orra White Hitchcock (1796-1863): An Amherst Woman of Art and Science," with a catalogue. In 2018, a solo exhibition of her work was featured at the American Folk Art Museum, entitled Charting the Divine Plan: The Art of Orra White Hitchcock (1796–1863)

Major works illustrated 

Edward Hitchcock's article in the American Journal of Science
Edward Hitchcock,  Report on the Geology, Mineralogy, Botany, and Zoology of Massachusetts, (Amherst, Mass.:  J.S. & C. Adams, 1833).
Edward Hitchcock,  Final Report on the Geology, Mineralogy, Botany and Zoology of Massachusetts, (Amherst, Mass.:  J.S. & C. Adams; Northampton, Mass.:  J. H. Butler, 1841).
Edward Hitchcock, Sketch of the Scenery of Massachusetts. With Plates From the Geological Report of Prof. Hitchcock, (Northampton, Mass.: J.H. Butler, 1842).
Edward Hitchcock.  Religious Lectures on Peculiar Phenomena in the Four Seasons, (Amherst, Mass.:  J.S. & C. Adams, 1850).

See also 
 Beneski Museum of Natural History, Amherst College

References

Further reading 

Daria D’Arienzo, “The Union of the Beautiful with the Useful:  Through the Eyes of Orra White Hitchcock,” The Massachusetts Review, 51:2 (Summer 2010):  294-344.
Robert L. Herbert and Daria D’Arienzo, Orra White Hitchcock (1796-1863):  An Amherst Woman of Art and Science,  (Amherst, Mass.: Mead Art Museum and University Press of New England, 2011).
Jordan D. Marche and Theresa A. Marche, “A ‘Distinct Contribution’:  Gender, Art and Scientific Illustration in Antebellum America,” Isis 89 (1998): 31-652.
Orra White Hitchcock 1796-1863: An Exhibition Held in the Charles P. Russell Gallery, Deerfield Academy, ed. Christina M. Cohen,  (Deerfield, Mass., 1991).
Orra White Hitchcock, A Woman of Amherst:  The Travel diaries of Orra White Hitchcock, 1847 and 1850, transcribed, edited and annotated by Robert L. Herbert, (Bloomington, Ind.:  iUniverse, Inc., 2008).
Eugene C. Worman, “The Watercolors and Prints of Orra White Hitchcock,” AB Bookman’s Weekly, 83 (February 13, 1989): 646-668).
Orra White Hitchcock, Fungi selecti picti, 1821. With an introduction by Robert L. Herbert. (Northampton, Mass.: Smith College Libraries, 2011.)

External links

 Edward and Orra White Hitchcock in the Archives at Amherst College
 Edward and Orra White Hitchcock Papers from the Amherst College Archives & Special Collections
 Deerfield Academy Archives, Orra White Hitchcock’s Herbarium parvum, pictum
 Hitchcock Family Papers, Pocumtuck Valley Memorial Association Library
 Hitchcock Papers, Jones Library Special Collections, Amherst, Massachusetts
 Orra White Hitchcock File, Edward Hitchcock File, Smith College Archives
 Exhibition at Mead Art Museum, Amherst College, "Orra White Hitchcock (1796-1863): An Amherst Woman of Art and Science"

1796 births
1863 deaths
People from Amherst, Massachusetts
19th-century American artists
American women illustrators
American illustrators
Botanical illustrators
Scientific illustrators
Artists from Massachusetts
19th-century American women artists
19th-century deaths from tuberculosis
Tuberculosis deaths in Massachusetts